A town and a nagar panchayat in Shahdol district in the Indian state of Madhya Pradesh. The city is divided into 15 wards in which elections are held every 5 years.

Demographics
As of the 2011 India census,  Khand (Bansagar) had a population of 10,653. Males constitute  roughly 53.25% of the population and females 46.75%. Khand (Bansagar) has an average literacy rate of 75.1%, higher than the district average of  66.7 %: male literacy is  85.02 %, and female literacy is  63.96 %. In Khand (Bansagar),  12% of the population is under 6 years of age. The largest religious group in the city is Hindu by a wide margin then Muslim and Buddhist.

References

Cities and towns in Shahdol district
Shahdol